Anthoney is a given name and a surname, which is derived from the Antonius root name.  Notable people with this name include the following:

Given name
Anthoney Hill (born 1971), American gridiron football player

Surname
Charles Anthoney (1902 – 1982), English footballer
Ernest Anthoney (1879 – 1961), Australian politician in South

See also

Anthony (given name)
Anthony (surname)

References